The First Moscow Conference (Codename: Caviar) of World War II took place from September 29, 1941 to October 1, 1941.

Prelude 
The initial contact with the USSR came with Presidential Envoy and Director of the Lend-Lease programme Harry Hopkins with Soviet leader Joseph Stalin in Moscow.

On 30 July 1941 Hopkins briefed journalists at Spaso House, the US Embassy residence. At 20.00, he was described as looking 'pale and tired' and speaking 'faintly, his voice dwindling away at times to an inaudible mumble'. Hopkins confirmed he had spoken with Stalin and had informed the Soviet leader of President Roosevelt's admiration for the Russian resistance to the German invasion of the Soviet Union. Hopkins added that he had told Stalin of the United States' resolve to support the USSR with supplies. Stalin thanked Hopkins and told him the confidence in his country would not be misplaced.

The pair met again at 18.00 the following day at the Kremlin. Hopkins once more returned to Spaso House and brief the press. He described how pleasantries were done away with and they got down to specifics. Hopkins added:

Hopkins concluded his business and flew back to London on Friday 1 August.

The Moscow conference was proposed following the meeting between British Prime Minister Winston Churchill and US President Franklin D. Roosevelt at Placentia Bay.

A joint message was sent to from Churchill and Roosevelt to Joseph Stalin with the proposal. It was delivered to Stalin on August 15 at 18.00 by US Ambassador Laurence Steinhardt and British Ambassador Sir Stafford Cripps. They handed over identical copies signed by Roosevelt and Churchill. Stalin immediately dictated a reply for presentation to the ambassadors giving his agreement to the proposal.

An announcement on Radio Moscow said:

The Conference 
The delegates flew into Moscow on 28 September. They were greeted by Vice-Commissar Andrei Vyshinsky and the staffs of the British and US embassies.

W. Averell Harriman representing the United States of America and Lord Beaverbrook representing the United Kingdom met with Vyacheslav Molotov (Soviet Minister of Foreign Affairs) presiding.

Their respective ambassadors took the delegates to meet Stalin on the same evening. Molotov was also present along with Maxim Litvinov who was attending as a delegate acted as translator.

The conference opened on 29 September at the residence of the Foreign Commissariat, the Spiridonovka Palace. Following a closed session an official communique was released, prepared by Quentin Reynolds (of Collier's magazine) and Vernon Bartlett MP (News Chronicle and BBC).

This main session lasted for 30 minutes but delegations appointed members for the committees who went into immediate session. They were instructed to have reports on the Soviet requirements ready by the morning of 3 October.

The conference reconvened on 1 October, two days ahead of schedule, for the second and final meeting of the main delegations.

The agreement signed, known as the First Protocol, was signed on 1 October 1941. The agreement was set to run until June 1942. It promised the Soviet Union 400 aircraft, 500 tanks and 10,000 trucks a month in addition to other supplies.

A joint statement was issued by Lord Beaverbrook and Avril Harriman, separate from the conference communique. The closing paragraph stated:

The delegates departed by Douglas passenger planes on 3 October where they boarded HMS Harrier in the White Sea. The Halcyon-class minesweeper took them to meet the County-class heavy cruiser HMS London to transfer the party at sea. A gangplank was passed between the two ships and American Admiral William Standley crossed first. Lord Beaverbrook crossed with a rope around his waist in case he fell. The ships separated and HMS London called via loudspeaker "Well done, Harrier, Well done".

In a speech of 6 November 1941 to mark the 24th anniversary of the October Revolution Joseph Stalin stated:

Churchill's Caviar 
Aside from the main events of the conference there was an incident regarding the purchase of caviar for Prime Minister Churchill. Philip Jordan, reporting for the News Chronicle from the news conference. However, his despatches were also carried by The Times and Lord Beaverbrook's own Daily Express.

Jordan learned from an undisclosed source that Lord Beaverbrook had sent an employee to buy £25GBP (approximately $100USD) for the Prime Minister. Churchill read the report and telegraphed Lord Beaverbrook, who in turn asked Jordan about the matter. Jordan refused to name his source and Beaverbrook accused younger officials from the British Embassy of leaking information.

Ultimately, while it turned out to be true that Churchill had ordered the caviar the amount was exaggerated. However, it was feared that it would reflect badly that such a large quantity of caviar was purchased at a time of rationing.

See also
 Anglo-Soviet Agreement
 Anglo-Soviet Treaty of 1942
 Declaration by United Nations
 Russia–United Kingdom relations#Second World War
 Diplomatic history of World War II
 Second Moscow Conference (1942)
 Third Moscow Conference (1943)
 Fourth Moscow Conference (1944) (TOLSTOY)
 List of World War II conferences

References

External links 
 YouTube - Pathe News Report of the Conference

World War II conferences
Soviet Union–United Kingdom relations
Soviet Union–United States diplomatic conferences
Diplomatic conferences in the Soviet Union
1941 in the Soviet Union
1941 conferences
1941 in international relations
1941 in Moscow